Simon Nicklin (born 23 September 1972) is a British former field hockey player who competed in the 1992 Summer Olympics.

References

External links
 

1972 births
Living people
British male field hockey players
Olympic field hockey players of Great Britain
Field hockey players at the 1992 Summer Olympics
Teddington Hockey Club players